Rovte (in older sources also Rovte pri Nemiljah) is a small settlement in the Municipality of Radovljica in the Upper Carniola region of Slovenia.

References

External links
Rovte at Geopedia

Populated places in the Municipality of Radovljica